Charles Domvile (1740 – 19 April 1810) was an Anglo-Irish politician.

Born Charles Pocklington, he assumed the surname of Domvile by Royal Licence on inheriting the estate of his uncle, Sir Compton Domvile, 2nd Baronet. Domvile was the Member of Parliament for Dublin County in the Irish House of Commons between April and June 1768.

References

1740 births
1810 deaths
18th-century Anglo-Irish people
Charles
Irish MPs 1761–1768
Members of the Parliament of Ireland (pre-1801) for County Dublin constituencies